Mececyon trinilensis, the Trinil dog, is an extinct canid species that lived in Indonesia during the Pleistocene.

Description 
The body size of Mececyon trinilensis been estimated to be about 22 kg. This size is the result of insular dwarfism.

Habitat and ecology 
Mececyon trinilensis is endemic to the island of Java. It was part of the Pleistocene Trinil Fauna of Java. Other animals of this Faunal assemblage were Bos palaesondaicus, the Indian muntjak (Muntiacus muntjak), Bubalus palaeokerabau, the Dubois santeng and Stegodon trigonocephalus. Other predators of the Trinil Fauna were the Trinil tiger (Panthera tigris trinilensis) and the leopard cat (Prionailurus bengalensis).

It has been estimated that Mececyon trinilensis hunted prey of 1 kg to 10 kg, preferably 5 kg in size. However this number could vary, because it is yet unknown if the Mececyon trinilensis hunted in packs, or if carrion left over by the Trinil tiger influenced its feeding habits.

Evolution 
Mececyon trinilensis probably evolved from Xenocyon lycanoides, like the larger Indonesian Merriam's dog (Megacyon merriami) and the Sardinian dhole (Cynotherium sardous). Its closest living relatives are the African wild dog (Lycaon pictus) and the dhole (Cuon alpinus).

The Trinil dog went extinct in the course of the Pleistocene. There is currently no evidence that this species survived into the Holocene.

References 

Prehistoric canines
Pleistocene mammals of Asia
Extinct animals of Indonesia